SSEC can refer to:

 IBM SSEC, an electromechanical calculator in the 1940s
 Sarnia Sports & Entertainment Centre, Ontario, Canada
Secondary Schools Examinations Council, British body 1917-1963
 Shri Shankaracharya Engineering College, an engineering college in Chhattisgarh, India
 Society for the Study of Early Christianity at Macquarie University in Sydney, Australia 
 South Seas Evangelical Church, in the Solomon Islands
  Space Science and Engineering Center at the University of Wisconsin–Madison, USA
 SSE Composite Index, Shanghai Stock Exchange index
 Stepping Stone Educational Centre in Port Harcourt, Rivers State